After a five-year absence Benny Ibarra returned with Todo O Nada. This album features collaborations with Erik Rubin, Alix, Dougie Bowne and musicians from Café Tacuba and Alex González from the Mexican Rock band Maná . The first single, "Uno", was top of the charts for eight weeks, became a gold record in two weeks and later went to Platinum. The second single was "Inspiraciòn", also included in the film soundtrack of same name.

Track listing 
"Uno" ( L: Alix Bauer M: Benny) –
"Hiéreme (L: Ruy García M:Benny, Dougie Borne, Vico Gutiérrez)" –
"Por Tu Amor" (L: Vico M:Benny, Dougie Borne, Vico Gutiérrez ) –
"Vuelo" (L: Ruy García M:Benny, Dougie Borne, Vico Gutiérrez) –
"María" ( L: Benny M: Billy Mendez, Memo Mendez Guiu, Benny)-
"Una Palabra" (L: Ruy García M:Benny, Dougie Borne, Vico Gutiérrez) –
"Todo O Nada" (L: Ruy García M: Benny) –
"Unico" (L: Memo Mendez Guiu M: Memo Mendez Guiu, Benny) –
"Fuego" (L: Ruy García M:Benny, Dougie Borne, Vico Gutiérrez) –
"Aire " (L: Ruy García M:Benny, Dougie Borne, Vico Gutiérrez )–
"Inspiración" (Memo Mendez Guiu) –

Benny Ibarra albums
2001 albums